The Confederación Unitaria de Trabajadores de Honduras (CUTH) is a national trade union center in Honduras. It was formed in 1992.

Trade unions in Honduras

Trade unions established in 1992
1992 establishments in Honduras